Aroana is a genus of moths of the family Noctuidae erected by George Thomas Bethune-Baker in 1906.

Species
 Aroana baliensis Hampson, 1918
 Aroana cingalensis Walker, [1866]
 Aroana hemicyclophora Turner, 1944
 Aroana ochreistriga Bethune-Baker, 1906
 Aroana olivacea Bethune-Baker, 1906
 Aroana porphyria Hampson, 1918
 Aroana rubra Bethune-Baker, 1906

References

Acontiinae